The Eyes of the Heart: Seeking a Path for the Poor in the Age of Globalization is a book written by Jean-Bertrand Aristide about the effects of globalization on Haiti.  Aristide takes the position that globalization is not a positive factor in the world, and he cites the World Bank and the International Monetary Fund as contributing to the economic downfall of Haiti.  This book was co-written by Laura Flynn, and published in 2000 by Common Courage Press.

References

Books about globalization
Books about Haiti
Politics of Haiti
Political books
2000 non-fiction books